Diabroctis mimas  is a species beetles of the scarab beetle family.

Description
These large beetles are black and metallic green and have a strong transverse clypeal carina on the pronotum anterior to the cephalic process. In the males the  prothorax is exceptionally massive. On the elytral margins there is fringe of setae projecting from the suture. This species uses horse, cow and capybara dung and fruits as food resources.

Distribution
This widespread and quite common species can be found in Mexico, French Guiana, Guyana, Suriname, Venezuela, Brazil, Paraguay, Bolivia and Peru.

Habitat

References
 Biolib
Scarabaeinae Life Desks
THE UNIVERSITY OF KANSAS SCIENCE BULLETIN

Scarabaeinae
Taxa named by Carl Linnaeus
Beetles described in 1758